Primula malacoides, called the fairy primrose or baby primrose, is a perennial species of Primula native to the Himalayas, Assam in India, Myanmar, and south-central and south east China. It has gained the Royal Horticultural Society's Award of Garden Merit.

Description 
This plant usually has purple flowers, although some may have red, white or bright-pink flowers.

Their hairy leaves measure at 4-8cm and are a pale-green colour. They usually grow to 30cm across and 20-40cm tall.

History 
This species was considered a weed as it would grow on the rice fields of Chinese farmers. This plant was cultivated from a seed by George Forrest in 1908. This species started gain popularity among commercial growers in England. Within a decade, a new strain which was colourful and fragrant was sold commercially in greenhouses in the USA and throughout Europe.

Cultivation 
This plant can be propagated by seed or by division in late summer.

This species is a popular ornamental place and can be used as a houseplant or as a greenhouse plant.

It should be grown in fertile, well-drained soil with regular waterings.

Pests and disease 
This plant is prone to infestation by aphids. Signs of infestation may include: honeydew secretion, galls, and distortion of leaves.

Toxicity 
The leaves may cause irritation. It is advised to wear gloves when handling this plant.

This species may also have allergenic properties with symptoms including rashes and headaches.

See also 

 Flora of India
 Flora of China
 List of primula diseases

References

malacoides
Plants described in 1886